The following lists events that happened during 1978 in Laos.

Incumbents
President: Souphanouvong 
Prime Minister: Kaysone Phomvihane

Events

Births
24 September - Chaleunsouk Oudomphanh, Olympic athlete

Deaths
2 May - Vong Savang, Lao crown prince
13 May - Sisavang Vatthana, last king of Laos

References

 
Years of the 20th century in Laos
Laos
1970s in Laos
Laos